Hayden Stevenson (July 2, 1877 – January 31, 1952) was an American film actor. He appeared in 108 films between 1915 and 1942. He was born in Georgetown, Kentucky and died in Los Angeles, California.

Selected filmography

 The Great Divide (1915)
 Where Love Leads (1916)
 Determination (1922)
 Flesh and Spirit (1922)
 The Lone Hand (1922)
 Trifling with Honor (1923)
 The Abysmal Brute (1923)
 The Acquittal (1923)
 The Whispered Name (1924)
 The Law Forbids (1924)
 The Reckless Age (1924)
 Dark Stairways (1924)
 Big Pal (1925)
 I'll Show You the Town (1925)
 The Patent Leather Pug (1925)
 Behind the Front (1926)
 The Devil's Partner (1926)
 The Whole Town's Talking (1926)
 Blake of Scotland Yard (1927)
 Man, Woman and Sin (1927)
 On Your Toes (1927)
 The Fourflusher (1928)
 Freedom of the Press (1928)
 Red Lips (1928)
 Silks and Saddles (1929)
 The Diamond Master (1929)
 College Love (1929)
 Vengeance (1930)
 The Lightning Warrior (1931)
 Woman Trap (1936)
 Federal Agent (1936)

References

External links

1877 births
1952 deaths
American male stage actors
American male film actors
American male silent film actors
Male actors from Kentucky
People from Georgetown, Kentucky
20th-century American male actors